Chris Simpson (born 30 March 1987 in Guernsey) is a professional squash player who represented England as a junior. His career-high world ranking was No. 20 in April 2014.

Simpson has competed in the Professional Squash Association World Squash Championships from 2009/2019.

Tournament Wins

 Men's CLIC Sargent St George's Hill Classic 2015 
 Men's Bedell Jersey Classic 2014 
 Men's FantasySquash Nottingham Open 2013 
 Men's Bedell Jersey Classic 2013

References

External links 
 
 
 

1987 births
Living people
English male squash players
Guernsey squash players
Commonwealth Games competitors for Guernsey
Squash players at the 2002 Commonwealth Games
Squash players at the 2006 Commonwealth Games
Squash players at the 2010 Commonwealth Games
Squash players at the 2014 Commonwealth Games
Guernsey people
People educated at Elizabeth College, Guernsey